Patrick Ngoma (born 21 May 1997) is a Zambian association football forward. He played for Nakambala Leopards and the Zambia national football team. He was part of the Zambia squad for the 2015 Africa Cup of Nations, and played in the final group match against Cape Verde as a substitute.

References

External links

1997 births
Living people
Zambian footballers
Zambian expatriate footballers
Zambia international footballers
Association football forwards
2015 Africa Cup of Nations players
2015 Africa U-23 Cup of Nations players
Al Ittihad Alexandria Club players
Red Arrows F.C. players
Egyptian Premier League players
Expatriate footballers in Egypt
Zambia youth international footballers